Octocrylene is an organic compound used as an ingredient in sunscreens and cosmetics.  It is an ester formed by the condensation of 2-ethylhexyl cyanoacetate with benzophenone.  It is a viscous, oily liquid that is clear and colorless.

The extended conjugation of the acrylate portion of the molecule absorbs UVB and short-wave UVA (ultraviolet) rays with wavelengths from 280 to 320 nm, protecting the skin from direct DNA damage.  The ethylhexanol portion is a fatty alcohol, adding emollient and oil-like (water resistant) properties.

Safety
Octocrylene can penetrate into the skin where it acts as a photosensitizer, resulting in an increased production of free radicals under illumination. It may also pass through the skin, into the blood stream, eventually being metabolized and excreted in urine in form of its metabolites. Octocrylene can convert to benzophenone through a retro-aldol condensation. The reaction occurs slowly over time, yielding significant concentration of benzophenone in all commercial cosmetics tested formulated with octocrylene.

In coral, octocrylene has been shown to accumulate in the form of fatty acid conjugates and trigger mitochondrial dysfunction.

Regulation
Palau banned the sale and use of 3 reef toxic UV filters including octocrylene in its Responsible Tourism Education Act of 2018.

See also

Sunscreen controversy

References

Carboxylate esters
Household chemicals
Sunscreening agents